Red Man was an American brand of chewing tobacco which was first introduced in 1904.

Red Man traditionally came as leaf tobacco, in contrast, to twist chewing tobacco or the ground tobacco used in snuff.  It is made by the Pinkerton Tobacco company of Owensboro, Kentucky.  In 1985, Pinkerton was acquired by a Swedish corporation, and after further corporate reshuffling, America's Best brand now falls under the umbrella of the Swedish Match company, which in turn is owned primarily by 
institutional investors.  The proportion owned by non-Swedish investors is approximately 80%.

History
The Red Man brand was introduced in 1904 by Pinkerton Tobacco (incorporated in 1901).

Early in its history, Red Man advertisements were painted on the sides of barns, featuring an endorsement from baseball player Nap Lajoie: "Lajoie chews Red Man, ask him if he don't."  Red Man was initially sold in a few Midwestern states; it expanded (in 1954) into the South and then (in 1963) largely nationwide. The corporation's marketing material describes Red Man's consumer base: "A large number of consumers work outdoors and enjoy hunting, fishing and watch [sic] auto racing."  Contemporary materials from Swedish Match also suggest that the brand name came from something of an homage to American Indians.

Marketing tie-ins with rural and outdoor sports have been a hallmark of the Red Man brand. From 1952 to 1955, Red Man produced a series of baseball cards, the only tobacco company to do so after 1920. The sets are valuable due to the appearance of 25 of the top players of 1952–55, including Stan Musial, Yogi Berra and Willie Mays.

In 1982, Red Man launched its first TV advertising ever, produced by the ad agency Benton & Bowles. This decision came after Levi Garrett's aggressive entrance on the chewing tobacco market in the US.

Since then, the brand has sponsored competitive events including the "Red Man All-American Pulling Series", a tractor pulling circuit, and the "Red Man All-American Bass Championship", a fishing competition. In 1991, under pressure from the Federal Trade Commission, which was enforcing a 1986 U.S. statute banning television ads for smokeless tobacco, Red Man agreed to stop displaying its "product logo, selling message or the color or design of the tobacco product or its package" during televised coverage of the tractor pulls. The competitive fishing circuit that culminated in the Bass Championship was sponsored by the company and called the "Red Man Tournament Trail" from 1983 to 2000, after which Wal-Mart took over as the name sponsor.

In January 2022, parent company Swedish Match announced that they would be changing brand's name to "America's Best Chew" and removing the depiction of a Native American chief on its packaging.

Flavors and varieties

Golden Blend
Select
America's Best Chew Silver Blend
Original
Plug

Dipping tobacco
 America's Best Chew Cut Natural
 America's Best Chew Long Cut Straight
 Red Man Long Cut Wintergreen (discontinued in 2021)

References

External links
Shorpy A photograph of outdoor advertising in Camden, NJ, 1939, showing the Red Man brand.

Chewing tobacco brands
Culture of the Southern United States
IARC Group 1 carcinogens
Stereotypes of Native American people